Carmen Guerrero-Nakpil (née Carmen Francisco Guerrero; July 19, 1922 – July 30, 2018) was a Filipina journalist, author, historian and public servant. She was a recipient of the S.E.A. Write Award.

Early life and education
She was born in Ermita, Manila on July 19, 1922, into the Guerrero clan of that town, who were painters and poets, as well as scientists and doctors.

Her paternal grandfather was León María Guerrero, who was likewise born in Ermita, Manila. He was the younger brother of Lorenzo Guerrero, the painter and mentor to Juan Luna. Dr. Jose P. Bantug referred to Leon Ma. Guerrero as the "Father of Philippine Botany", having classified and described hundreds of Filipino medicinal plants.

Her maternal grandfather was Gabriel Beato Francisco (18 March 1850 – 19 December 1935), Tagalog writer, journalist, novelist, playwright, born in Sampalok, then a town independent of Manila. Francisco's contribution to the development of Tagalog literature lies in the novel. Chronologically considered his Cababalaghan ni P. Bravo might be regarded as the first novel to be published in Tagalog literature. (This fact appears to be unknown to students and historians of Tagalog literature, not mentioned in Inigo Ed. Regalado's Ang Pagkaunlad ng Nobelang Tagalog (1939). Secondly, Francisco was responsible for introducing the historical genre in the beginning and early development of the Tagalog novel.

Her parents were the prominent doctor Alfredo Guerrero and Filomena Francisco, who was celebrated as one of the Philippines' first female pharmacists.

She studied at St. Theresa's College, Manila and graduated with a Bachelor of Arts degree in 1942.

Career

Between 1946 and 2006, she worked as either staff member, editor or editorial columnist at the Evening News, The Philippines Herald, the Manila Chronicle (where she had a daily column for 12 years), The Manila Times, Asia magazine, and Malaya, in addition to contributing lectures, essays, short stories to other publications in the Philippines and the rest of the world. She has published a total of ten books : Woman Enough, A Question of Identity, History Today, The Philippines and the Filipinos, The Rice Conspiracy (a novel), the Centennial Reader and Whatever; as well as a wildly successful autobiographical trilogy Myself, Elsewhere; Legends & Adventures; and Exeunt.

In the 1960s, she served as Chairman of the Philippine National Historical Commission and in the 1990s, the Manila Historical Commission, and director-general of the Technology Resource Center from 1975 to 1985. She was elected to the Executive Board of the UNESCO, Paris in 1983 by popular vote of the international assembly.

Personal life
Mrs. Nakpil was married to Lt. Ismaél A. Cruz in 1942 and to architect and city planner Ángel E. Nákpil in 1950 and was widowed twice. She has five children, Gemma Cruz Araneta, Ismaél G. Cruz, Ramón Guerrero Nakpil, Lisa Guerrero Nákpil, and Luis Guerrero Nákpil, two step-daughters Nina Nákpil Campos and Carmina Nákpil Dualan, numerous grandchildren and a few great-grandchildren.

Her family includes her brother, lawyer and diplomat, León María Guerrero III, best known for his translations of Rizal's two novels, Noli Me Tangere and El Filibusterismo, as well as the prize-winning work on Jose Rizal, The First Filipino: her second brother Mario X. Guerrero, was one of the country's first foreign-trained cardiologists. Other well-known Guerreros include the poet and revolutionary Fernando María Guerrero and Dr. Manuel Guerrero and Dr. Luis Guerrero, both eminent physicians. Cousin Wilfrido María Guerrero was a playwright and stage director.

Death
Nakpil died on 30 July 2018, of pneumonia, at the age of 96. She was laid to rest at the Loyola Memorial Park in Marikina, following a wake on 31 July and a funeral mass on 2 August.

References

1922 births
2018 deaths
Deaths from pneumonia in the Philippines
Filipino women historians
20th-century Filipino historians
Carmen
Filipino newspaper editors
Filipino columnists
Filipino women columnists
People from Ermita
Writers from Manila
Burials at the Loyola Memorial Park
Filipino women journalists
20th-century Filipino women writers